The Spanish Fork Fire Station was built in 1934 in Spanish Fork, Utah.  It included Colonial Revival architecture.  It was listed on the National Register of Historic Places in 1985.

The station was delisted from the National Register in 1996.  Delisting occurs usually when a historic building has been demolished or otherwise lost its historic integrity.

See also
National Register of Historic Places listings in Utah County, Utah

References

Fire stations completed in 1934
Buildings and structures in Spanish Fork, Utah
Colonial Revival architecture in Utah
Fire stations in Utah
Government buildings on the National Register of Historic Places in Utah
National Register of Historic Places in Utah County, Utah
1934 establishments in Utah